The 2019 Laurie O'Reilly Cup is the 12th edition of the competition. The first test was played in Perth on August 10 and the second test was played in Auckland on August 17. The tests were part of double-header matches between the All Blacks and Australia during their Bledisloe Cup series. 

The Black Ferns won the series in a clean sweep and successfully defended their title.

Table

Fixtures

Game 1 

Notes:
centre Kilisitina Moata'ane and prop Olivia Ward-Duin made their international debut for the Black Ferns.

Game 2

Squads

Australia 
Head Coach Dwayne Nestor named a 28-player squad for the 2019 Laurie O'Reilly Cup.

Head coach:  Dwayne Nestor

New Zealand 
Head Coach Glenn Moore named a 28-player squad for the 2019 Laurie O'Reilly Cup.

Head coach:  Glenn Moore

Broadcast 
All the O’Reilly Cup matches were broadcast LIVE on FOX SPORTS, Kayo and RUGBY.com.au Radio in Australia.

References 

Laurie O'Reilly Cup
Australia women's national rugby union team
New Zealand women's national rugby union team
Laurie O'Reilly Cup
Laurie O'Reilly Cup